This page documents the tornadoes and tornado outbreaks of 1986, primarily in the United States. Most tornadoes form in the U.S., although some events may take place internationally. Tornado statistics for older years like this often appear significantly lower than modern years due to fewer reports or confirmed tornadoes.

Synopsis

The 1986 tornado season was one of the least deadly on record in the United States with just 15 fatalities; only 1910 and 2018 had fewer deaths from U.S. tornadoes. There were no F5 tornadoes in 1986 and just three rated F4, none of which resulted in any fatalities. Overall tornado numbers were below normal, although they were higher than 1987. The total number of tornadoes was 765. Idaho saw 10 tornadoes between May and September, a high number for the state that would not be surpassed until 1993.

Events
Confirmed tornado total for the entire year 1986 in the United States.

January
There were no tornadoes confirmed in the US in January. This was the first month with no tornadoes since November 1976.

February
There were 30 tornadoes confirmed in the US in February.

February 5–6

An outbreak of tornadoes occurred, extending from Texas to Tennessee. The most notable tornadoes of this outbreak all came from one supercell in the Houston area, which produced 4 tornadoes, the strongest being an F3 which caused 2 deaths and devastated a mobile home park and David Wayne Hooks Airport southeast of Tomball. On the 6th a F3 tornado travelled 10.5 miles through Bradley County, Polk County, and McMinn County, Tennessee, the tornado hit the Chatata Valley area particularly hard. The tornado then travelled through mainly rural areas of Polk and McMinn Counties, before dissipating 10 miles south of Athens.

March
There were 76 tornadoes confirmed in the US in March.

March 10–12

A large tornado outbreak produced 41 tornadoes on March 10–12, killing six people in Alabama, Indiana and Ohio. One tornado rated F4 in Meridian, Mississippi resulted in no fatalities.

April
There were 84 tornadoes confirmed in the US in April.

April 19
An early-morning F3 tornado struck Sweetwater, Texas, resulting in one death and 100 injuries. It was part of an outbreak that produced 14 tornadoes.

May
There were 173 tornadoes confirmed in the US in May.

May 8 
Two tornadoes struck Edmond. The first was a strong F3 which caused significant damage in Edmond, Oklahoma and injured 15 people. The second and much weaker tornado touched down as the main tornado dissipated, causing F1 damage on a discontinuous path. Overall, no fatalities were reported.

June
There were 134 tornadoes confirmed in the US in June.

July
There were 88 tornadoes confirmed in the US in July.

July 2
An F2 tornado killed three in Onslow County, North Carolina.  This would be the most people killed by a single tornado in 1986.

July 18
Fridley, Minnesota was struck by a photogenic, multi-vortex F2 tornado which captured by KARE 11. It caused significant tree and structural damages.

July 28
An F4 tornado struck Nebraska and Iowa near Sioux City, Iowa. There were no fatalities.

August
There were 67 tornadoes confirmed in the US in August.

August 7
An F2 tornado struck Cranston, Rhode Island becoming the first, and only, significant tornado in Rhode Island history.

September
There were 65 tornadoes confirmed in the US in September.

September 24
An F2 tornado hit Vina, California and injured one person.

September 28
An F4 tornado struck Farrar, Iowa resulting in no fatalities.

October
There were 26 tornadoes confirmed in the US in October.

November
There were 17 tornadoes confirmed in the US in November.

December
There were 5 tornadoes confirmed in the US in December.

See also
 Tornado
 Tornadoes by year
 Tornado records
 Tornado climatology
 Tornado myths
 List of tornado outbreaks
 List of F5 and EF5 tornadoes
 List of North American tornadoes and tornado outbreaks
 List of 21st-century Canadian tornadoes and tornado outbreaks
 List of European tornadoes and tornado outbreaks
 List of tornadoes and tornado outbreaks in Asia
 List of Southern Hemisphere tornadoes and tornado outbreaks
 List of tornadoes striking downtown areas
 Tornado intensity
 Fujita scale
 Enhanced Fujita scale

References

External links
 U.S. tornadoes in 1986 - Tornado History Project
 Tornado deaths monthly

 
1986 meteorology
Tornado-related lists by year
Torn